Franz Xaver Eder (November 4, 1925 – June 20, 2013) was a Roman Catholic bishop.

Ordained in 1954 for the Roman Catholic Diocese of Passau, Germany, Eder was named auxiliary bishop of the Passau Diocese in 1977. In 1984, Eder was named coadjutor bishop of the Passau and succeeded as bishop in 1984. In 2001, Eder retired.

Notes

1925 births
2013 deaths
German prisoners of war in World War II
Roman Catholic bishops of Passau
Commanders Crosses of the Order of Merit of the Federal Republic of Germany